Nikhil Raut (born 11 December 1986) is an Indian actor known for his work in Marathi television as a theater actor and in Marathi cinema.
predominantly working in film and television industry since last 19 years.

Early life and background 

Nikhil Raut is from Pune and but staying at Mumbai. He is married to Mayuri Raut since 22 April 2014. Nikhil Raut is studied in Modern High School, Pune. Later, he attended Modern College, Pune.

Filmography

Television

Short Film

Stage

Feature films

References

External links
 

Marathi actors
Indian male film actors
Indian theatre directors
Male actors from Pune
21st-century Indian male actors
Male actors in Marathi cinema
1986 births
Living people
Indian male soap opera actors
Male actors in Marathi theatre
Male actors in Marathi television